Wanasa may refer to:

Wanasah,  a free-to-air satellite TV channel
Wanassa, a title in ancient Greek, sometimes translated as "queen"